Candelaria fibrosa is a species of fungi. In English, it goes by the common name lemon lichen. It also goes by the common name fringed candleflame lichen.

It occurs on the bark of wood and it resembles Xanthoria hasseana.

References

Lichen species
Candelariales